Chach may refer to
 Chach, a historic principality of Uzbekistan and the modern-day location of the capital city Tashkent
 Chhachh, a region in Punjab, Pakistan
 Chach of Alor, a historic ruler of Sindh

See also 
 Chach Nama, a book about the history of Sindh
 Battle of Chach, an 11th-century battle fought at the banks of the Indus
 Chech, a geographical regions encompassing parts of Bulgaria and Greece